Svetoslav Petrov may refer to:

 Svetoslav Petrov (footballer born 1978), former Bulgarian football midfielder
 Svetoslav Petrov (footballer born 1988), Bulgarian football midfielder for Lokomotiv Sofia